Robert Lloyd (floruit 1600-1625) was a courtier and Member of Parliament.

He was Member of Parliament for Ludlow in 1614 and Minehead in 1621.

He was a "sewer" or server in the household of Anne of Denmark and later became an administrator, as the queen's "Admiral".

He was knighted in 1616. In October 1617 it was said that the queen dismissed him.

References

Household of Anne of Denmark
17th-century Welsh politicians